Whitefish (Salish: epɫx̣ʷy̓u, "has whitefish") is a city in Flathead County, Montana, United States. According to the 2020 United States Census, there were 7,751 people in the city.

History
Long before the first Europeans came to Whitefish, native American tribes inhabited the area, most notably the Kootenai, the Pend d’Oreille, and the Bitterroot Salish. The Kootenai lived in the area for more than 14,000 years, inhabiting the mountainous terrain west of the Continental Divide, and traveled east of the divide for occasional buffalo hunts. Though trappers, traders, and waves of westward immigrants passed through the area during the second half of the century, it wasn’t until 1883 that the first permanent settler, John Morton built a cabin on the shore of Whitefish Lake, just west of the mouth of the Whitefish River. Morton was joined by the local logging industry forefathers—including the Baker and Hutchinson brothers—in the early 1890s. Logging crews “boomed-up” their logs behind a dam built at the river mouth by the Boston & Montana Commercial Company, which, when opened, created a rush of water that helped float the logs down the river to Kalispell.

The Great Northern Railway was built through what is now Whitefish in 1904, which sparked the development of the town. The town incorporated in 1905. The area was originally known as Stumptown due to the abundant amount of timber that had to be cleared to build the town and railroad and because tree stumps were left in the streets throughout downtown. Early residents of the town worked for the railroad and nearby logging industries. In 2006, over 68,000 passengers embarked and disembarked through the historic Whitefish Depot, a stop on Amtrak's Empire Builder line, with some percentage of those headed to the ski resort on Big Mountain.

Skiing has been part of the Whitefish area for more than 50 years. In 1937, the Whitefish Lake Ski Club obtained a special permit from the U.S. Forest Service enabling them to build cabins and trails in the Hell Roaring Creek region. Great Falls businessmen Ed Schenck and George Prentice recognized the area’s potential and, after World War II, began efforts to develop a full-fledged ski resort on the mountain with local people donating labor, preparing the slopes, even giving up free time to help push through an all-weather mountain road. On December 14, 1947, Schenck, Prentice, and a thousand townsfolk stood on the newly christened ski resort's slopes to watch the brand new T-Bar lift bring their community vision to life.

The town started a curfew siren in 1919 that they called the "ding-dong ordinance". The historic siren was restored to the new city hall.

Geography 
The town is located on the western side of the continental divide, near Glacier National Park. The Whitefish River bisects the town of Whitefish as it courses south by southeast to briefly join the Stillwater River before its flows enter the Flathead River.

The historic district of Whitefish is a neighborhood called "The Avenues". This neighborhood is bordered by East 2nd Street to the north, Kalispell Avenue to the west, East 7th Street to the south, and Pine Avenue to the east. It is next to downtown, with many of its houses on the historic registry.

Climate
According to the Köppen Climate Classification system, Whitefish has a humid continental climate, abbreviated "Dfb" on climate maps. Large seasonal temperature differences typify this climatic region, with warm to hot (and often humid) summers and cold (sometimes severely cold) winters.

Demographics

2000 census
As of the census of 2000, there were 5,032 people, 2,229 households, and 1,203 families living in the city. The population density was 1,138.5 people per square mile (439.6/km). There were 2,652 housing units at an average density of 600.0 per square mile (231.7/km). The racial makeup of the city was 95.97% White, 0.14% African American, 1.11% Native American, 0.58% Asian, 0.06% Pacific Islander, 0.72% from other races, and 1.43% from two or more races. Hispanic or Latino of any race were 1.93% of the population.

There were 2,229 households, out of which 26.2% had children under the age of 18 living with them, 41.2% were married couples living together, 9.8% had a female householder with no male present, and 46.0% were non-families. 34.4% of all households were made up of individuals, and 10.9% had someone living alone who was 65 years of age or older. The average household size was 2.20, and the average family size was 2.86.

The population was spread out in the city, with 21.6% under 18, 8.6% from 18 to 24, 32.9% from 25 to 44, 22.5% from 45 to 64, and 14.4% 65. The median age was 37 years. For every 100 females, there were 92.4 males. For every 100 females age 18 and over, there were 91.7 males.

The median income for a household in the city was $33,038, and the median income for a family was $41,009. Males had a median income of $36,298 versus $19,583 for females. The per capita income for the city was $24,098. About 13.8% of families and 18.2% of the population were below the poverty line, including 32.9% of those under age 18 and 12.7% of those age 65 or over.

2010 census
As of the census of 2010, there were 6,357 people, 2,982 households, and 1,562 families living in the city. The racial makeup of the city was 95.8% White, 0.5% African American, 0.8% Native American, 0.8% Asian, 0.1% Pacific Islander, 0.3% from other races, and 1.7% from two or more races. Hispanic or Latino of any race were 2.8% of the population.

There were 2,982 households, of which 24.5% had children under the age of 18 living with them, 40.1% were married couples living together, 8.5% had a female householder with no husband present, 3.8% had a male householder with no wife present, and 47.6% were non-families. 36.7% of all households were made up of individuals, and 11.4% had someone living alone who was 65 years of age or older. The average household size was 2.10, and the average family size was 2.77.

The median age in the city was 40.1 years. 19.6% of residents were under 18; 7.1% were between the ages of 18 and 24; 30.2% were from 25 to 44; 28.9% were from 45 to 64, and 14.3% were 65 years of age or older. The gender makeup of the city was 50.3% male and 49.7% female.

2019 American Community Survey Estimate
As of 2019, according to the Census' American Community Survey estimates, of 2019, there were 7,714 people, 3,332 households in the city. The median age was 41 years old. The median yearly salary was 52,037 dollars, the home average value was 364,500 dollars, 54.7% had a college degree, and 9.5% were veterans who served in wartime higher than the national average. The population was 97% White, 2% Hispanic, and 1% Native American.

Arts and culture
Whitefish is known for its environmentalism, with an extensive system of protected trails and forests designed to purify the town's water. It has been ranked one of the top places for skiing in the United States. The town has been labeled as a "model of resistance" against hate and racism.

Annual cultural events
Huckleberry Days Arts Festival is an annual arts festival featuring 100 artists and food vendors. The event includes a huckleberry dessert bake-off contest.

The Taste of Whitefish is an annual event that has been held for more than twenty-five years. The event features over twenty-five restaurants, caterers and beverage companies offering samples of their specialties.

The Whitefish Winter Carnival is an annual winter festival celebrating winter topics with a parade, "penguin plunge" into Whitefish Lake, and snow sculptures.  It is held the first weekend in February each year.

Under the Big Sky Music Festival takes place annually in Whitefish. The festival explores the breadth and legacy of America, with both traditional and contemporary takes on America's rich musical traditions, across two stages in naturally formed amphitheaters on a local ranch.

The Whitefish Arts Festival (WAF) occurs over the 4th of July weekend and is a tradition going back over forty years. It is a favorite throughout the Northwest and maintains a long tradition of high-quality arts and fine crafts. Artists from across the country are represented in the WAF. Metal sculptures, paintings and photography, woodworking, pottery, jewelry, clothing, and home decorations are just some of the featured fine arts. All of the art is handmade.

The annual Whitefish Trail Hootenanny occurs in downtown Whitefish to celebrate and support the public land and trails that ring the town. It includes live music and local culinary specialties to raise funds to protect public land.

Every year Whitefish hosts a songwriter retreat called Nashville Heads West. This retreat brings Nashville-based songwriters to Whitefish to River Meadow Ranch for one week of writing songs with the added inspiration "of being under Montana’s big sky."

Sports
The Whitefish Trail Legacy Run is an annual ultra trail race to celebrate the unique public trail system. It includes a 50-kilometer ultra-marathon and a 1/2 marathon, a 10-kilometer, and a 5-kilometer race. It takes place in the first week of October in conjunction with the Oktoberfest celebration.

The World Indoor Golf Championship has been held in Whitefish for over sixteen years and is a 9-hole "miniature golf" tournament in downtown Whitefish.

The Glacier Challenge is a six-leg, multi-sport relay covering 50 miles of Montana. The race features six legs of running, biking, canoeing, and kayaking covering almost 50 miles in and around Whitefish. A triathlon has recently been added to include the first three legs of the Glacier Challenge. Participants enter as a solo team, partner duo, or group team. The 50 miles race consists of an 8-mile run, kayak, road bike, mountain bike, canoe, and 3.1-mile run. There are also food vendors, activities for children, and music.

Government and politics
Whitefish's government system consists of a city council with six council members and a mayor and city manager. As of March 2020, the mayor was John Muhlfeld and the current city manager is Dana Smith.

Education
The Whitefish School District serves Whitefish. Schools in the district include Muldown Elementary School, Whitefish Middle School. Whitefish High School and Whitefish Independent High School. Whitefish School District offers students K-12 a wide range of academic supplements, for example, online Virtual High School and dual credit opportunity through Flathead Valley Community College. Whitefish High School is known as the Bulldogs.

Whitefish High School is home to numerous state championship teams; the most recent is the girls' cross country team. They have won four consecutive titles. Other state athletic accomplishments have been made in football, girls' and boys' golf, volleyball, boys' and girls' basketball, boys' and girls' track and field, girls' softball, boys' and girls' tennis, speech, and debate.

Whitefish Community Library is a public library in the town.

Media
Whitefish is part of the Missoula media market, which covers a seven-county area of northwestern Montana. The city's main newspaper is The Whitefish Pilot, while the Flathead Beacon, a regional newspaper for the Flathead Valley based in Kalispell, publishes Whitefish Area News. Three radio stations are licensed to Whitefish, all owned by Bee Broadcasting, Inc.: KJJR 880 AM, KSAM 1240 AM, and KWOL-FM 105.1.

Infrastructure

Medical
The Kalispell Regional Medical Center is the county's largest hospital and serves the area.

North Valley Hospital is a private nonprofit general medicine and surgical Critical Access Hospital located in Whitefish and is affiliated with Kalispell Regional Medical Center.

Transportation

U.S. Route 93 and MT 40 run through Whitefish. Commercial airline service is available at Glacier Park International Airport along U.S. Route 2.

The Whitefish Amtrak station is served by Amtrak's Chicago–Portland/Seattle Empire Builder, as well as intercity buses to Kalispell and Missoula. The station is Amtrak's busiest in Montana. The Whitefish Amtrak station is owned by Stumptown Historical Society and was listed on the National Register of Historic Places in 2002.

Museums and other points of interest
 Great Northern Brewing Company
 Alpine Theatre Project
 Whitefish Theatre Company

Notable people

 David Booth, professional hockey player, now lives in Whitefish, originally from Washington, MI
 Bob Brown, Montana Secretary of State
 Murray Craven, former NHL player
  Adrianne Curry-Rhode, former model, actress, first season winner of America's Next Top Model in 2003
 Edward J. DeBartolo Jr., owner of the San Francisco 49ers
 Pat Donovan, former Dallas Cowboys offensive lineman, now lives in Whitefish, originally from Helena
 Kaitlyn Farrington, professional snowboarder, 2014 gold-medal Women's Half Pipe
 Sierra Fellers, professional skateboarder, born in Whitefish
 David Graham, retired professional golfer
 Steve Howe, former MLB pitcher
 Kyle Aaron Huff, mass murderer
 Dorothy M. Johnson, Western author
 Gary Knopp, member of the Alaska House of Representatives
 Ross M. Lence, political scientist and author
 Braxton Mitchell, politician
 Frank B. Morrison, Jr., Montana Supreme Court justice
 John Morrison, Montana state auditor
 Terry Moulton, Wisconsin politician
 Jake Sanderson, professional hockey player
 Brian Schweitzer, Governor of Montana
 Richard B. Spencer, white supremacist
 Constance Towers, singer and actress
 Maggie Voisin, freestyle skier
 Ryan Zinke, former United States Secretary of the Interior

References

External links

 Official City website
 Whitefish Chamber of Commerce
 Official Whitefish Travel Planning and Visitor Information
 

 
Cities in Montana
Cities in Flathead County, Montana